Girolamo Ricciulli (1580 – 7 August 1626) was a Roman Catholic prelate who served as Bishop of Belcastro (1616–1626).

Biography
Girolamo Ricciulli was born in Cosenza, Italy in 1580.'
On 5 December 1616, he was appointed during the papacy of Pope Paul V as Bishop of Belcastro.
On 13 December 1616, he was consecrated bishop by Giovanni Garzia Mellini, Cardinal-Priest of Santi Quattro Coronati, with Francesco Sacrati (cardinal), Titular Archbishop of Damascus, and Vincenzo Landinelli, Bishop of Albenga, serving as co-consecrators. 
He served as Bishop of Belcastro until his death on 7 August 1626.

Episcopal succession
While bishop, he was the principal co-consecrator of:
Bernardo Florio, Bishop of Canea (1621); 
Paulus Pucciarelli, Bishop of Andros (1621); and 
Bernardino Piccoli, Coadjutor Bishop of Strongoli (1622).

References

External links and additional sources
 (for Chronology of Bishops) 
 (for Chronology of Bishops) 

17th-century Italian Roman Catholic bishops
Bishops appointed by Pope Paul V
1580 births
1626 deaths